Faith Hope and Charity was the name of a vocal group from Tampa, Florida. They are best known for their 1975 hit, "To Each His Own". They were also an in-demand group of session singers in New York studios during the 1970s.

Career
The founding members of the group were Zulema Cusseaux, Brenda Hilliard and Al Bailey. They were originally a trio called the Lovelles, when they met record producer Van McCoy, who signed them to a recording contract at Maxwell Records. At this time, the group's name was changed to Faith, Hope and Charity.

Their song "So Much Love" hit #14 on the Billboard R&B chart and #51 on the Hot 100 in 1970. The subsequent release "Baby Don't Take Your Love" reached #36 R&B and #96 in the Hot 100.

Cusseaux left Faith, Hope and Charity in 1971, shortly after a label switch to Sussex Records, and started a solo career. She was eventually replaced by Diane Destry in 1974. Their biggest hit came with a switch to RCA Records in the mid-1970s. With Van McCoy still writing and producing for the group, they hit the top of the R&B charts with "To Each His Own" (1975; #1 R&B, #15 Dance, #50 Hot 100).

They then scored another hit in January 1976, reaching #38 in the UK Singles Chart with "Just One Look" (from their album, Faith, Hope & Charity). It was a cover version of a Doris Troy track. Their single "Don't Pity Me" reached #20 on the R&B chart in 1978. After a second album with RCA, which produced a couple of minor hits, Destry left, but Hilliard and Bailey carried on for another album in 1978, with 20th Century, before splitting up.

It seemed that there was another member of Faith Hope & Charity in 1977. Priscilla Baskerville has been credited as being a member of the group on some recordings.

Post FH&C
Brend Hilliard and Albert Bailey released a single "Talking About Loving You" bw "This Has Happened Before" that was released on Clarama Records CL-1200, credited to Brenda & Albert.

Zulema Cusseaux died on September 30, 2013, at age 66.

Bailey died on May 27, 2020.

Discography

Studio albums

Singles

Note
There was a girl band of the 1990s called Faith Hope & Charity that had no connection to this group.

References

Further reading
 Billboard, July 8, 1978 - Page 78 Closeup, Faith Hope & Charity album review
 The Story on Faith Hope & Charity by The Chancellor of Soul (Mike Boone) Chancellor's Chronicles.

External links
 [ Faith Hope & Charity] at AllMusic
 Faith Hope & Charity at Discogs

African-American musical groups
American dance music groups
American soul musical groups
American disco groups
Musical groups established in 1969
Musical groups disestablished in 1979
Musical groups from Florida